Gunsword may refer to:

Gun Sword, a 2005 anime
Gunblades, a series of weapons from the Final Fantasy franchises introduced in 1999
pistol swords, in use since the 16th century